Emily Cook may refer to:

Emily Cook (beauty queen) (born 1986), Miss Georgia 2009
Emily Cook (skier) (born 1979), American freestyle skier